The 1961 NFL season was the 42nd regular season of the National Football League (NFL). The league expanded to 14 teams with the addition of the Minnesota Vikings, after the team's owners declined to be charter members of the new American Football League. The schedule was also expanded from 12 games per team to 14 games per team where it would stay for 16 years. The Vikings were placed in the Western Conference, and the Dallas Cowboys were switched from the Western Conference to the Eastern.

The season ended when the Green Bay Packers shut out the New York Giants 37–0 in the 1961 NFL Championship Game.

Draft
The 1961 NFL Draft was held from December 27-28, 1960 at Philadelphia's Warwick Hotel. With the first pick, the Minnesota Vikings selected halfback Tommy Mason from Tulane University.

Expansion draft
The 1961 NFL expansion draft was held on January 26, 1961, with the Minnesota Vikings selecting 36 players from the other NFL teams. The one-year old Dallas Cowboys were exempted from losing a player in this expansion draft.

Conference races
The new Minnesota Vikings won their first game when they upset the Chicago Bears team, 37–13, on September 17, 1961.  Mike Mercer made the Vikings' first points on a 12-yard field goal, and Fran Tarkenton guided the team to five touchdowns. The Vikings finished at 3–11 after that good start. With 14 teams in two conferences, each NFL team now played a 14-game schedule: a home-and-away series with the other six teams in their division, and two interconference games.

In Week Five, the Giants and Eagles led the Eastern Conference, and the Packers and 49ers led the Western, all with records of 4–1. The following week, the 49ers lost to the Bears, 31–0, while Green Bay beat Minnesota 33–7. The Giants and Eagles, both winners, remained tied in the Eastern standings at 5–1. In Week Seven, Dallas edged the Giants 17–16, while the Eagles beat the Redskins 27–24 on Sonny Jurgensen's last-quarter touchdown pass to Tommy McDonald. In Week Nine (November 12), the Giants beat the Eagles, 38–21, to give both teams 7–2 records, while Green Bay survived a game at Chicago, 31–28, that would otherwise have tied both teams at 6–3; Green Bay led the Western race the rest of the way.  In Week Ten, New York's 42–21 win over Pittsburgh put it at 8–2, while Cleveland's 45–24 win over Philadelphia put both those teams at 7–3. In Week 11 (December 3), New York lost 20–17 to Green Bay, while the Eagles won 35–24 at Pittsburgh, tying the race again.

The Giants and Eagles, both at 9–3, met the following week in Philadelphia (December 10).  After New York trailed 10–7, Coach Allie Sherman replaced Y. A. Tittle with Charlie Conerly, who at 40 was the NFL's oldest player.  Conerly threw for three touchdowns for the 28–24 win.  The winning score came after the Eagles were penalized for roughing the kicker on the Giants' fourth down, giving the Giants first down on the 24.  At season's end (December 17), the Eagles rallied to beat Detroit 27–24, and hoped for a Giants' loss to force a playoff.  At that moment, New York and Cleveland were tied 7–7 with two minutes left.  A long punt by the Giants' Don Chandler pinned the Browns on their own 7-yard line, and ended any threat of a loss.

Final standings

Postseason

NFL Championship Game
Green Bay 37, New York 0 at City Stadium, Green Bay, Wisconsin, December 31, 1961

Playoff Bowl
The Playoff Bowl was between the conference runners-up, for third place in the league. This was its second year and it was played a week after the title game.
Detroit 38, Philadelphia 10 at Orange Bowl, Miami, Florida, January 6, 1962

Awards
Most valuable player
 Associated Press – Paul Hornung, halfback, Green Bay Packers
 Newspaper Enterprise Association – Y. A. Tittle, quarterback, New York Giants
 United Press International – Paul Hornung, halfback, Green Bay Packers
Rookie of the year
 Associated Press – Mike Ditka, tight end, Chicago Bears
 United Press International – Mike Ditka, tight end, Chicago Bears
Coach of the year
 Associated Press – Allie Sherman, New York Giants
 United Press International – Allie Sherman, New York Giants
Other
 1961 All-Pro Team
 1962 Pro Bowl

Coaching changes

Offseason
Minnesota Vikings: Norm Van Brocklin became the expansion team's first head coach.
New York Giants: Jim Lee Howell was replaced by Allie Sherman.
Philadelphia Eagles: Buck Shaw was replaced by Nick Skorich.
Washington Redskins: Mike Nixon was replaced by Bill McPeak.

In-season
St. Louis Cardinals: Pop Ivy resigned after 12 games. Chuck Drulis, Ray Prochaska, and  Ray Willsey served as co-head coaches for the final two games of the season.

Stadium changes
 Briggs Stadium, the home of the Detroit Lions, was renamed Tiger Stadium
 The expansion Minnesota Vikings began play at Metropolitan Stadium in Bloomington
 The Washington Redskins moved from Griffith Stadium to D.C. Stadium

See also
1961 American Football League season

References

 NFL Record and Fact Book
 NFL History 1961–1970 (Last accessed December 4, 2005)
 Total Football: The Official Encyclopedia of the National Football League

National Football League seasons